The Cheap Seats was a television show on FOX Sports that mostly consisted of interviews with pro baseball players at home via Skype. It debuted during the 2010 Major League Baseball season with Chris Rose as its host, becoming best known for the many appearances by San Francisco Giants closer Brian Wilson, including the first on-camera showing of "The Machine". The host for 2011 was former pitcher David Wells.

External links
 The Cheap Seats website
 David Wells' Twitter feed

References

American sports television series
Baseball on television in the United States
Major League Baseball on Fox
2010 American television series debuts
2011 American television series endings
Fox Broadcasting Company original programming